Housing, Theory and Society is a quarterly peer-reviewed academic journal covering the fields of housing studies, social theory and social policy. The editor-in-chief is Hannu Ruonavaara (University of Turku) and it is published by Routledge. It was established in 1984 as Scandinavian Housing and Planning Research, obtaining its current name in 1999. According to the Journal Citation Reports, the journal has a 2018 impact factor of 2.317.

References

External links

Routledge academic journals
English-language journals
Publications established in 1984
Quarterly journals
Urban studies and planning journals